Donjeta Halilaj (born 12 March 2000) is a Kosovan footballer who plays as a forward and has appeared for the Kosovo women's national team.

Career
Halilaj has been capped for the Kosovo national team, appearing for the team during the UEFA Women's Euro 2021 qualifying cycle.

International goals

See also
List of Kosovo women's international footballers

References

External links
 
 

2000 births
Living people
Sportspeople from Gjakova
Kosovan women's footballers
Women's association football forwards
KFF Mitrovica players
KFF Hajvalia players
Kosovo women's international footballers
Kosovan people of Albanian descent
Sportspeople of Albanian descent
Albanian women's footballers